Tell Masoud is an archaeological site west northwest of Tell Hazzine and 2 km away west from the Litani in the Beqaa Mohafazat (Governorate). It dates at least to the Chalcolithic.

References

Baalbek District
Chalcolithic sites of Europe
Bronze Age sites in Lebanon